Henry Nicholas John Gunther (June 6, 1895 – November 11, 1918) was an American soldier and possibly the last soldier of any of the belligerents to be killed during World War I. He was killed at 10:59 a.m., about one minute before the Armistice was to take effect at 11:00 a.m.

Gunther had recently been demoted, and was seeking to regain his rank just before the war ended.

Early life 
Henry Gunther was born into a German-American family in east Baltimore, Maryland, on June 6, 1895. His parents, George Gunther (1869–1919) and Lina Roth (1866–1938), were both children of German immigrants.  He grew up in Highlandtown, an East Baltimore neighborhood heavily influenced by German immigrants, where his family belonged to Sacred Heart of Jesus Roman Catholic parish.  Henry Gunther worked as a bookkeeper and clerk at the National Bank of Baltimore. He had joined the Roman Catholic service order for laymen, the Knights of Columbus, in 1915.

Military service 
Being of recent German-American heritage, Gunther did not automatically enlist in the armed forces as many others did soon after the United States declared war on Germany in April 1917. In September 1917, he was drafted and quickly assigned to the 313th Infantry Regiment, nicknamed "Baltimore's Own"; it was part of the larger 157th Brigade of the 79th Infantry Division. Promoted as a supply sergeant, he was responsible for clothing in his military unit, and arrived in France in July 1918 as part of the incoming American Expeditionary Forces. A critical letter home, in which he reported on the "miserable conditions" at the front and advised a friend to try anything to avoid being drafted, was intercepted by the Army postal censor. As a result, he was demoted from sergeant to private.

Gunther's unit, Company 'A', arrived at the Western Front on September 12, 1918. Like all Allied units on the front of the Meuse-Argonne Offensive, it was still embroiled in fighting on the morning of November 11. The Armistice with Germany was signed by 5:00 a.m., local time, but it would not come into force until 11:00 a.m.  Gunther's squad approached a roadblock of two German machine guns in the village of Chaumont-devant-Damvillers near Meuse, in Lorraine. Gunther got up, against the orders of his close friend and now sergeant Ernest Powell, and charged with his bayonet. The German soldiers, already aware of the Armistice that would take effect in one minute, tried to wave Gunther away. He kept going and fired "a shot or two". When he got too close to the machine guns, he was shot in a short burst of automatic fire and killed instantly. The writer James M. Cain, then a reporter for the local daily newspaper The Sun, interviewed Gunther's comrades afterward and wrote that "Gunther brooded a great deal over his recent reduction in rank, and became obsessed with a determination to make good before his officers and fellow soldiers".

American Expeditionary Forces commanding General John J. Pershing's "Order of The Day" on the following day specifically mentioned Gunther as the last American killed in the war.  The Army posthumously restored his rank of sergeant and awarded him a Divisional Citation for Gallantry in Action and the Distinguished Service Cross. Several years later, a  post, number 1858 of the Veterans of Foreign Wars in east Baltimore, was named after him.  The VFW Post honoring the name of Sergeant Gunther has since ceased to exist. 

Gunther's remains were returned to the United States in 1923 after being exhumed from a military cemetery in France, and buried at the Most Holy Redeemer Cemetery in Baltimore. Subsequent investigations revealed that on the last day of World War I, during the armistice negotiations in the railroad cars encampment at the Compiegne Forest, French commander-in-chief Marshal Foch refused to accede to the German negotiators' request to declare an immediate ceasefire or truce so that there would be no more useless waste of lives among the common soldiers. The failure to declare a truce, even between the signing of the documents for the Armistice and its entry into force "at the eleventh hour of the eleventh day of the eleventh month", caused about 11,000 additional men to be wounded or killed – far more than usual, according to the military statistics.

Memorials 

On "Veterans Day" (in France,  "Armistice Day"), November 11, 2008, a memorial was constructed near the place in Chaumont-devant-Damvillers in Lorraine where Gunther died. Two years later on the same remembrance holiday observance, November 11, 2010, a memorial plaque was also unveiled at his grave site in America at 10:59 a.m. by the German Society of Maryland.

See also
Albert Mayer, the first soldier killed, 1914
George Edwin Ellison, the last British Army soldier killed, 1918
George Lawrence Price, the last Canadian Army and British Empire/Commonwealth soldier killed, 1918
Marcel Toussaint Terfve, the last Belgian soldier killed in World War I, 1918
Augustin Trébuchon, the last French Army soldier killed, 1918
John Parr, the first British Army soldier killed, 1914
Jules Andre Peugeot, the first French Army soldier killed, 1914
History of the Germans in Baltimore

References 

1895 births
1918 deaths
American military personnel killed in World War I
American people of German descent
American Roman Catholics
Bookkeepers
Burials at Most Holy Redeemer Cemetery (Baltimore)
Military personnel from Baltimore
Recipients of the Distinguished Service Cross (United States)
United States Army soldiers
United States Army personnel of World War I